Richard Llewellyn Brooks (born August 20, 1941) is a retired American football player and coach. He was the head coach at the University of Oregon from 1977 to 1994, the National Football League's St. Louis Rams from 1995 to 1996, and the University of Kentucky from 2003 to 2009.

Brooks' 1994 Oregon team won the Pac-10 title and played in the 1995 Rose Bowl. For his efforts that season, he won a number of national coaching awards. The University of Oregon named the field at Autzen Stadium Rich Brooks Field in honor of his 18 seasons as coach for the Ducks.

Education
Brooks attended Oregon State University in Corvallis, where he majored in physical education and played defensive back for the football team under head coach Tommy Prothro. He received his bachelor's degree in 1963 and completed his master's degree in education at Oregon State the next year. He was also a member of Phi Delta Theta fraternity at Oregon State.

Coaching career
Brooks's coaching career started at Oregon State as an assistant freshman coach while working on his master's degree. After receiving his master's degree, he moved to Sacramento, California, where he accepted an assistant coaching job at Norte Del Rio High School. He soon returned to his alma mater to serve as defensive line coach for the Beavers from 1965 through 1969 under new head coach Dee Andros.

Brooks rejoined Prothro in 1970 as linebackers coach at UCLA, then followed Prothro to the Los Angeles Rams in 1971 as special teams and fundamentals coach. After two years in the NFL, Brooks returned to Oregon State to serve as defensive coordinator in 1973 under Andros, after previous DC Bud Riley left for the CFL. Brooks returned to the NFL in 1974 as defensive backs and special teams coach for the San Francisco 49ers under Dick Nolan, then went back to UCLA in 1976 to coach linebackers under first-year head coach Terry Donahue, where he helped the Bruins to a top-20 final ranking.

Oregon
Brooks accepted his first head coaching position in 1977 at the University of Oregon, Oregon State's bitter rival. At the time of his arrival, the Ducks had not had a winning season since 1969, and only one since 1965. Brooks' first contract was a four-year deal at $32,000 per year.
In 1980 a scandal was exposed from the 1977–79 academic years, and the school was placed on a two-year probation (including a one-year bowl ban) by the NCAA for violations in recruiting, misuse of funds and academic standards.

Brooks's teams dominated the instate rivalry with Oregon State, compiling an overall record of 14–3–1, which kept him popular during several disappointing seasons. In 1989, he led the Ducks to a berth in the Independence Bowl—their first bowl appearance since 1963. Brooks led them to three more bowls during his tenure, becoming the first coach in school history to take the Ducks to four bowl games. (The Pac-8 did not allow a second bowl team from the conference until 1975). His best season came in 1994, when he led the Ducks to the first outright conference title in the school's 100-year football history and a berth in the Rose Bowl. That team won a then school-record tying nine games, the first time the Ducks had won that many since 1948. Brooks was named Pac-10 Coach of the Year, and also won the Paul "Bear" Bryant Award as national coach of the year.

Brooks left Oregon for the NFL after the 1994 season. His 91 wins were a school record until his successor and former offensive coordinator, Mike Bellotti, broke it in 2006; his 109 losses remain a school record. His overall record at Oregon was 18 games under .500, largely due to his first seven teams winning only 22 games combined. Nonetheless, Brooks is credited with reviving Oregon's football program and setting the stage for its rise to national prominence under Bellotti and Chip Kelly.

St. Louis Rams
On February 10, 1995, Brooks accepted a four-year contract at $625,000 per year to become the head coach of the Rams, who were preparing to move from Los Angeles to St. Louis for that season. He spent two years rebuilding, in which the team went 13–19, but was fired at the end of the 1996 season. Brooks then spent four seasons on Dan Reeves' staff in Atlanta, and served as interim head coach for the final two games of the Falcons' 1998 Super Bowl season while Reeves was recuperating from heart surgery.

Kentucky
After two years away from the game, Brooks was hired as head coach at the University of Kentucky prior for the 2003 season. He agreed to a five-year contract at $725,000 per year. There was some controversy surrounding Brooks' hiring, since he hadn't coached at the college level in almost a decade. Brooks inherited a team that was 7–5 in 2002, but was just beginning to feel the effect of NCAA probation imposed because of recruiting violations committed by a prior Kentucky coaching staff. In Brooks' first three seasons his squads posted records of 4–8, 2–9 and 3–8 (9–25 overall, 4–20 in Southeastern Conference games).

Brooks coached the 2006 Kentucky squad to a 7–5 regular season. The Wildcats earned their first bowl bid since 1999, against Clemson in the Music City Bowl in Nashville, Tennessee where Brooks' Wildcats defeated the Tigers 28–20 for Kentucky's first bowl victory since 1984.

On December 23, 2006, Kentucky Athletics Director Mitch Barnhart announced that the university and Brooks had agreed to a contract extension for four years, plus an additional year at the university's option. Brooks' base pay was $1 million per year plus other incentives.

In 2007, the Kentucky compiled an 8–5 won-loss record overall and 3–5 in the SEC East including wins over the #1 ranked LSU Tigers and intrastate rival #8 ranked Louisville Cardinals. Kentucky rose to as high as #8 in the AP Poll. The Wildcats closed out their campaign in the 2007 Music City Bowl, this time defeating the Florida State Seminoles by a score of 35–28.

On January 18, 2008, the Kentucky athletics department announced that when Brooks chose to retire, former Kentucky player and then offensive coordinator Joker Phillips would become the football team's next head coach. No date was set for this transition, but the action was taken to provide prospective recruits assurance of a smooth transition.

In 2008, the Wildcats went 7–6, defeating favored East Carolina, the Conference USA champions, in the 2009 Liberty Bowl. Brooks became the first Kentucky coach to win bowl games in three consecutive years.

On September 30, 2009, Brooks announced on his Twitter page that he had undergone a procedure to remove skin cancer from his leg.

Brooks announced his retirement from collegiate coaching on January 4, 2010. As planned, Joker Phillips succeeded him.

After leaving the Wildcats Brooks returned to Oregon, living in Lane County near the McKenzie River. On September 23, 2016 Brooks and former UK player and Tennessee Titan Wesley Woodyard were inducted into the University of Kentucky Athletics Hall of Fame.

Head coaching record

College

NFL

References

1941 births
Living people
American football safeties
Atlanta Falcons coaches
Kentucky Wildcats football coaches
National Football League defensive coordinators
Oregon Ducks athletic directors
Oregon State Beavers football coaches
Oregon State Beavers football players
St. Louis Rams coaches
UCLA Bruins football coaches
High school football coaches in California
People from Sierra County, California
Players of American football from California
St. Louis Rams head coaches